Partie de campagne (English: A Day in the Country) is a 1946 French featurette written and directed by Jean Renoir. The film is based on the short story "Une partie de campagne" (1881) by Guy de Maupassant, who was a friend of Renoir's father, the renowned painter Auguste Renoir. It chronicles a love affair over a single summer afternoon in 1860 along the banks of the Seine.

Renoir never finished filming due to weather problems, but producer Pierre Braunberger turned the material into a release in 1946, ten years after it was shot. Joseph Burstyn released the film in the U.S. in 1950.

Plot
Monsieur Dufour (André Gabriello), a shop-owner from Paris, takes his family for a day of relaxation in the country. When they stop for lunch at the roadside restaurant of Poulain (Jean Renoir), two young men there, Henri (Georges D'Arnoux) and Rodolphe (Jacques B. Brunius), take an interest in Dufour's daughter Henriette (Sylvia Bataille) and wife Madame Dufour (Jane Marken). They scheme to get the two women off alone with them. They offer to row them along the river in their skiffs, while they divert Dufour and his shop assistant and future son-in-law, Anatole (Paul Temps), by lending them some fishing poles. Though Rodolphe had arranged beforehand to take Henriette, Henri maneuvers it so that she gets into his skiff. Rodolphe then good-naturedly settles for Madame Dufour.

As Henri rows, Henriette expresses her enthusiasm for the countryside. Henri suggests that she could come visit again, on her own, by train if necessary, and offers to meet her. Henriette says that her father would never permit it.

Henri rows to a secluded spot on the riverbank which he refers to as his "private office". Henriette initially resists his amorous advances, but stops struggling after a moment.

A rainstorm that has been threatening all afternoon arrives, but the party's return to the inn is not depicted.

Title cards indicate that years have passed and that Henriette has married Anatole. One day, they end up at the place where Henri seduced Henriette. While Anatole dozes, his wife takes a walk, and encounters Henri. With tears in her eyes, she reminisces about their brief time together. Then, when Anatole wakes up, Henri hides until they leave.

Cast
 Sylvia Bataille as Henriette
 Georges D'Arnoux as Henri
 Jane Marken as Madame Dufour
 André Gabriello as Monsieur Dufour
 Jacques B. Brunius as Rodolphe
 Paul Temps as Anatole
 Gabrielle Fontan as Grandmother
 Jean Renoir as Uncle Poulain
 Marguerite Renoir as Waitress

Production
Future leading directors Jacques Becker and Luchino Visconti worked as Renoir's assistant director and set dresser respectively. The film was shot in July, soon after France had elected the Popular Front government, and employers had negotiated the Matignon agreement, providing wage increases, 40-hour weeks, trade union rights, paid holidays and improved social services.

References

External links

A Day in the Country: Jean Renoir’s Sunday Outing an essay by Gilberto Perez at the Criterion Collection

1946 films
1946 short films
1946 romantic drama films
French romantic drama films
Films based on works by Guy de Maupassant
Films directed by Jean Renoir
1940s French-language films
1940s unfinished films
Featurettes
French black-and-white films
French drama short films
Films scored by Joseph Kosma
1940s French films